Goba is an administrative ward in the Ubungo district of the Dar es Salaam Region of Tanzania. In 2016 the Tanzania National Bureau of Statistics report there were 53,432 people in the ward, from 42,669 in 2012.

Goba Secondary School shares its name, and is located within the district.

References

Kinondoni District
Wards of Dar es Salaam Region